Bangladesh Road Transport Workers Federation or BRTWF was established in 1991, after Shajahan Khan successfully united Truck, Bus and Automobile Workers Federations. It is currently the largest trade union in Bangladesh.

Former Shipping Minister Shajahan Khan is the incumbent President of the Federation. Osman Ali is the General Secretary, Sadiqur Rahman Hiru is the Organiser. Abdur Rahim Box Dudu, Mofizul Haque Bebu, Tajul Islam are vice-presidents. Humayun Kabir Khan, Jubayer Jakir, Shojib Ali, Rofiqul Islam, M.A. Majid and Abul Bahar serve as joint-secretary of the central committee. Soto Monir MP is the board chair of the Tangail district.

Criticism 
Bangladesh Road Transport Workers Federation was heavily criticised for their role in the 2018 Bangladesh road-safety protests. They were once accused of snatching newspapers that criticised their leader.

References

Trade unions in Bangladesh
1972 establishments in Bangladesh
Organisations based in Dhaka